Matthieu Sprick (born 29 September 1981 in Sarreguemines, Moselle) is a French former professional cyclist who last rode for UCI ProTeam .

Major results

2003
1st, Tour du Doubs
2007
1st, Stage 4 Combativity award, Tour de France
2008
1st, Stage 1, Tour de Langkawi

External links

1981 births
Living people
People from Sarreguemines
French male cyclists
Sportspeople from Moselle (department)
Cyclists from Grand Est